The Hope of Glory: Reflections on the Last Words of Jesus from the Cross is a book by Jon Meacham, published by Convergent Books in 2020.

Summary
In the book, which originated as a series of sermons, Meacham examines the last seven phrases Jesus spoke from the cross, according to the gospels.

Reception
Kirkus Reviews called it "a middling contribution to Christian studies". Publishers Weekly called it "eloquent yet inconsistent". Newsweek had included the book in its list of "The 20 Most-Anticipated Books of 2020".

References

2020 non-fiction books
Books about Jesus
Random House books